The 2021 Georgia poultry plant accident was an industrial disaster that occurred on January 28, 2021, in Gainesville, Georgia, United States. Six people were killed by asphyxiation and at least ten were injured when a liquid nitrogen leak occurred inside a poultry processing plant owned by Foundation Food Group.

Background 
Gainesville has many poultry processing plants employing thousands of people, earning the city the nickname "Poultry capital of the world". The plant where the accident occurred was owned by Prime Pak Foods until January 2021, when it merged into Foundation Food Group. The facility processes raw chicken for foodservice and commercial sale. 

The air humans breathe contains ~78% nitrogen and ~21% oxygen. Refrigeration systems used in the factory relied on liquid nitrogen as a refrigerant. According to the U.S. Chemical Safety Board, when leaked into open air, liquid nitrogen vaporizes into its gaseous state, and is nontoxic. However, the infiltration of large quantities of gaseous nitrogen displaces oxygen in the air, and can lead to death by asphyxiation after a period of time in the oxygen-deprived environment.

Leakage and emergency response 
The liquid nitrogen leak occurred shortly after 10:00 a.m. EST. It was falsely initially reported to have been an explosion. The leak occurred in a freezer room at the plant. Three workers entered the freezer room and immediately died of asphyxiation. Additional workers subsequently entered the room, two of whom also died immediately. A sixth person died while being transported to the hospital. Local and county firefighters were notified by 10:12 a.m. of burn victims at the plant; they arrived to find evacuated workers, some injured, outside the building. At least four firefighters reported respiratory issues and were taken to Northeast Georgia Medical Center. About 130 factory workers were bussed to a Free Chapel church campus in Gainesville and examined for injuries; some were hospitalized. Of the ten people who were hospitalized, three were placed in intensive care. The leak was contained but about 1.5 miles of Memorial Park Drive/Road, where the factory and nearby Lyman Hall Elementary School is located, which was ordered to shelter-in-place, was closed; it had reopened by 1:30 p.m.

Investigation 
Hall County Fire Department Division Chief Zach Brackett stated that firefighters, the U.S. Occupational Safety and Health Administration (OSHA), and the Georgia state fire marshal are investigating the cause of the leak. The U.S. Chemical Safety Board is also investigating. The cause has yet to be determined.

OSHA's investigation determined that the leak occurred as a result of a freezer malfunction, which released liquid nitrogen that rapidly vaporized and displaced the oxygen in the confined space of the freezer room. The agency found that Foundation Food Group had failed to adequately train its employees on the hazards associated with liquid nitrogen in confined spaces, failed to implement a permit-required confined space program, and failed to implement an appropriate lockout–tagout procedure for the freezers, among other violations.  Officials, including U.S. Labor Secretary Marty Walsh, called the six deaths "entirely avoidable."

See also
 Occupational Safety and Health Administration
U.S. Chemical Safety and Hazard Investigation Board
 Inert gas asphyxiation

References 

2021 disasters in the United States
Poultry plant accident
2021 industrial disasters
Industrial accidents and incidents in the United States
January 2021 events in the United States